Louis Rooy was a Belgian bobsledder. He competed in the four-man event at the 1928 Winter Olympics.

References

Year of birth missing
Year of death missing
Belgian male bobsledders
Olympic bobsledders of Belgium
Bobsledders at the 1928 Winter Olympics
Place of birth missing